Katharina Maisch (born 12 June 1997) is a German athlete. She competed in the women's shot put event at the 2021 European Athletics Indoor Championships.

References

External links
 

1997 births
Living people
German female shot putters
Place of birth missing (living people)
Athletes (track and field) at the 2020 Summer Olympics
Olympic athletes of Germany
20th-century German women
21st-century German women